The German submarine U-210 was a Type VIIC U-boat that served with the Kriegsmarine during World War II. Laid down on 15 March 1941 as yard number 639 at F. Krupp Germaniawerft in Kiel, she was launched on 23 December and commissioned on 21 February 1942.

Design
German Type VIIC submarines were preceded by the shorter Type VIIB submarines. U-210 had a displacement of  when at the surface and  while submerged. She had two shafts and two  propellers.

U-210 was fitted with five  torpedo tubes (four fitted at the bow and one at the stern), fourteen torpedoes, one  SK C/35 naval gun, 220 rounds, and a  C/30 anti-aircraft gun. The boat had a complement of between forty-four and sixty.

Service history
U-210 undertook a single war patrol, departing Kiel on 18 July 1942 under the command of Rudolf Lemcke and heading for the north central Atlantic Ocean. The patrol was uneventful until 6 August 1942 when Convoy SC 94 was located. Despite heavy fog, U-210 was spotted on radar by the Canadian destroyer . Both ships opened fire; while the range was too close for the destroyer's main guns, machine gun fire shot up the bridge and conning tower, preventing use of the deck gun. As the destroyer passed astern, a shell from her rear battery hit the conning tower, killing the entire bridge crew; fifty caliber machine gun fire silenced the submarine's flak gun. The senior surviving officer of U-210 ordered her to dive, but forced a slow straight course which allowed Assiniboine to ram her just abaft the conning tower as she dove. This resulted in the submarine's electric motors failing and damage to the propellers. The ballast tanks were blown and the attacking destroyer rammed again as U-210 surfaced; a pattern of shallow-set depth charges were dropped at the same time. As the submarine sank, Assiniboine hit her with another  shell. 37 survivors were pulled from the water and became prisoners of war. Six men of her crew died during this battle.

Wolfpacks
U-210 took part in two wolfpacks, namely:
 Pirat (29 July – 3 August 1942)
 Steinbrinck (3 – 6 August 1942)

References

Bibliography

External links

World War II submarines of Germany
German Type VIIC submarines
U-boats commissioned in 1942
Ships built in Kiel
U-boats sunk in 1942
U-boats sunk by Canadian warships
U-boats sunk by depth charges
World War II shipwrecks in the Atlantic Ocean
1941 ships
Maritime incidents in August 1942